The 1965–66 season was the 42nd season in the existence of AEK Athens F.C. and the seventh consecutive season in the top flight of Greek football. They competed in the Alpha Ethniki and the Greek Cup. The season began on 28 November 1965 and finished on 10 July 1966.

Overview

The 1965–66 season was characterized both for AEK Athens and for Greek football in general, by both interesting and strange events. The strictness of the football authorities was the price paid by the yellow-blacks on the effort made at the beginning of the season with their agent and former player, Kleanthis Maropoulos, in order to cooperate with the representatives of the regional clubs, creating a block of reaction to the dominance of Olympiacos and Panathinaikos in the decisions of the centers of authority. The "eternals", alarmed by the coalition of the rest that Maropoulos seemed to be succeeding even threatened to withdraw from the national Championship, terrorizing the smaller ones with the suspicion of loss of revenue from it, delaying its start until 28 November, when the first matchday was set.

In AEK, the start of the season was overshadowed by the conflict between the management and Mimis Papaioannou and by the latter's decision to leave the pitches and turn to singing. The 23-year-old forward, having impressed Real Madrid officials with his performance and skills in a 3–3 friendly draw on 12 May 1965, was negotiating a transfer to the Spanish club and when he run into the management's refusal to his concession, he became bittered and withdrew from the club's activities. Taking advantage of his vocal abilities, he participated in the musical group that surrounded Stelios Kazantzidis, with whom he left for a tour in the Greek immigrants of Germany. The abstention of Papaioannou put an obstacle on the plans of AEK coach, Tryfon Tzanetis who in the summer of 1965 had taken care to shield the club with impressive transfers such as the defener of Apollon Athens, Tasos Vasiliou, the forward of PAO Safrafolis, Kostas Nikolaidis and the big star the Fostiras in the midfield, Panagiotis Ventouris, while Nikos Stathopoulos, Giorgos Karafeskos and Michalis Simigdalas were promoted from the infrastructure departments to the first team. The absence of Papaioannou from the team's preparation and his looming absence from their competitive duties forced Kostas Nestoridis, who had made the decision to leave AEK, to change his decision and remain with the team at the start of the season. However, due to his advanced age, Nestoridis was no more sufficient to fill the gap of Papaioannou and AEK started their competitive activities in the Championship with two defeats and one victory in the first 3 matches. Αt the beginning of December 1965, the differences between AEK and Papaioannou have begun to brigde and after getting a new contract of 500,000 drachmas, he returned to the team, shortly before the derby with Panathinaikos at the Leoforos Alexandras Stadium. Despite the fact that the lack of training caused him to suffer from cramps throughout the match, Papaioannou contributed to AEK's 2–3 victory by scoring one of the three goals while the other two scored by Kostas Nikolaidis. That match was the beginning of a 14-match undefeated streak, which brought the club on a distance of 3 points from the top. AEK was firmly in contention for the title, but the next two matches with the derbies at Karaiskakis Stadium against Olympiacos and in Nea Filadelfeia against Panathinaikos negated any hopes they may have had. On 27 March at Faliro, Olympiacos was sweeping, winning by 4–0 and in 3 April in the match against Panathinaikos, as the game was at 1–1 and while there had been previous violent episodes between the players in the first half, Panathinaikos scored at the 88th minute with Takis Loukanidis from an offside position. The referee awarded the goal and wild incidents occurred with the participation of fans entering the field, which resulted in the match permanently stopped at the expense of AEK, who were zeroed and the game awarded to Panathinaikos. These incidents, led the officials of AEK not to participate in the next away match in Serres against Panserraikos as a sign of protest. AEK were again zeroed and the threat of relegation after a possible third zeroing forced the club to return to the Championship, eventually finishing 3rd.

AEK began their obligations in the Greek Cup eliminating Edessaikos at home for the round of 32, then Apollon Kalamarias away at the round of 16 and Ethnikos Piraeus at home in the quarter-finals. The semi-final draw that came out were AEK - Kavala and Olympiacos - Trikala. Kavala demanded that the match be played at their home ground citing a provision of the then regulations that stipulated that if one of the two teams came from Northern Greece in a pair of semi-finals, then the home team was automatically designated. AEK did not accept it, arguing that this regulation only concerned the clubs from Thessaloniki and not all clubs of Northern Greece in general. In order to reconcile things, the HFF, set the match at a neutral ground, the Kaftanzoglio Stadium, but Kavala refused to compete, insisting that the match should be played at their stadium. Thus, AEK advanced to the final as they were awarded the game without a match, where Olympiacos had already qualified after their 5–0 victory over Trikala. The definition by the HFF of setting the Final on 10 July 1966, at the Karaiskakis Stadium, brought the reactions of the Olympiacos whose management sent a letter to the Federation announcing their decision not to show up, protesting the advanced date in relation to the preparation of the club of Piraeus for the next season's European Cup. Thus, on 7 July, the HFF, unable to convince Olympiacos for their participation in the Final, declared AEK the Cup winner with a 2–0 victory without a match.

In the midst of such situations, Kostas Nestoridis, one of the greatest Greek footballers and one of the timeless "yellow-black" legends, departed from the club after 11 years of presence.

Players

Squad information

NOTE: The players are the ones that have been announced by the AEK Athens' press release. No edits should be made unless a player arrival or exit is announced. Updated 10 July 1966, 23:59 UTC+2.

Transfers

In

 a.  plus Panagiotis Stasinopoulos.

Out

Loan out

Renewals

Overall transfer activity

Expenditure:  ₯1,935,000

Income:  ₯0

Net Total:  ₯1,935,000

Pre-season and friendlies

Alpha Ethniki

League table

Results summary

Results by Matchday

Fixtures

Greek Cup

Matches

Statistics

Squad statistics

! colspan="9" style="background:#FFDE00; text-align:center" | Goalkeepers
|-

! colspan="9" style="background:#FFDE00; color:black; text-align:center;"| Defenders
|-

! colspan="9" style="background:#FFDE00; color:black; text-align:center;"| Midfielders
|-

! colspan="9" style="background:#FFDE00; color:black; text-align:center;"| Forwards
|-

! colspan="9" style="background:#FFDE00; color:black; text-align:center;"| Left during season
|-

|}

Disciplinary record

|-
! colspan="14" style="background:#FFDE00; text-align:center" | Goalkeepers

|-
! colspan="14" style="background:#FFDE00; color:black; text-align:center;"| Defenders

|-
! colspan="14" style="background:#FFDE00; color:black; text-align:center;"| Midfielders

|-
! colspan="14" style="background:#FFDE00; color:black; text-align:center;"| Forwards

|-
! colspan="14" style="background:#FFDE00; color:black; text-align:center;"| Left during season

|}

References

External links
AEK Athens F.C. Official Website

AEK Athens F.C. seasons
AEK Athens